Bedlam is a British supernatural drama television series created by David Allison, Neil Jones, and Chris Parker. It was first broadcast on 7 February 2011 on Sky Living and Sky Living HD. The series finale was broadcast on 15 March 2011. In December 2011, it was announced that a second series had been commissioned for broadcasting in early 2012, with an updated cast. Series two was broadcast from June 2012 with Lacey Turner taking the lead as a suspended paramedic with the ability to see dead people.

On 11 March 2013, it was announced on Twitter that Bedlam would not be returning for a third series.

Plot
The series focused on an upmarket block of flats called "Bedlam Heights", formerly a mental asylum, and the supernatural activity taking place there. The character Jed Harper (Theo James) possesses the ability to see ghosts, which are generally not visible to others, and receives visions of their deaths. The hauntings are generally malevolent, and it is up to Jed to determine the spirits' motives and thwart their goals. His flatmates are his adopted cousin, Kate (Charlotte Salt), who assists her father, Warren (Hugo Speer), who owns the complex; Ryan (Will Young), who is troubled by the recent violent death of his brother; and Molly (Ashley Madekwe), a childhood friend of Kate and Jed. The asylum was formerly owned and run by Warren's family for generations, and he worked there when his father ran it, before it was closed down after the ill-treatment of patients was revealed.

The second series saw the cast changed, with suspended paramedic Ellie (Lacey Turner) beginning to see ghosts. She travels to Bedlam Heights (now renamed "Brightmoor") in order to seek out Jed Harper. Whilst there, she befriends Max (Jack Roth), the complex's barman; Dan (Nikesh Patel), who has replaced Kate; and Keira (Gemma Chan), a childhood friend of Kate's and now Warren's girlfriend. Warren and, briefly, Kate are the only cast members to return from the first series.

Episodes

Series 1 (2011)

Series 2 (2012)

Main cast

Ghosts

The Ghost Driver
The ghost of a man who died in a collision, but was not consciously aware of his death. He had been driving down the same road where he died picking up hitchhikers and murdering them out of subconscious realization that he was dead. He appears as a normal human at first but when Jed confronts him over the fact, he is dead he changes into a full ghost with black eyes, pale skin and loses the ability to speak. He is able to pass on when Jed shows him that he died and that his wife's spirit is waiting for him on the road side where her body was thrown, allowing the two to cross over.

James McAllister
Ryan's younger brother who was drowned in a canal in a prank gone wrong a year prior to the show. He is currently unable to pass on due to his brother's inability to move on from his death. Jed sees him by the canal reading a letter his brother threw in the lake as part of his grief therapy.

The Drowned Woman
One of Bedlam's many abused patients who Jed suspects was sent to the institute by a jealous husband for taking a lover. She was murdered by the doctors in an immersion tank during treatment and her ring was taken by one of the staff. Her spirit is roused when Kate is given the newly discovered ring as a present and the ghost begins to target her and anyone else who comes into possession of it. She has power over water and causes many water appliances to ooze and secrete black liquid. She is put to rest when Jed returns her ring to her.

Bedlam Ghosts
Many other trapped spirits in the hospital that reveal themselves at the windows just before Jed tries to leave and warn him he must be wary of Kate. Originally believing there was only a single ghost Jed soon discovered the building is infested with the tormented souls of former patients who appear to have been roused by the building in the hospital. In episode 2 Jed is suspicious some of the ghosts may have murdered Kate's grandfather in revenge for his abusive behaviour toward them.

The Ghost in the walled up room
A spirit that appears to be trapped in a walled up room somewhere inside of Bedlam that is targeting Kate. It is reaching out to Kate in her nightmares and pulling her into its prison. The ghost also seems to have a weak possession of Kate as her reflection becomes distorted several times through the show.

William Mackay
A man imprisoned in Bedlam because he tried to convince people his wife was mentally unwell, only to have people believe he was the one who was mentally unwell. Mackay's wife eventually took her own life and those of his two young sons by carbon monoxide poisoning in the family car, causing Mackay to slash his own throat in grief and rage. He becomes active as a ghost upon the arrival of new tenant Leah. Appearing as one of the more powerful spirits in Bedlam he can actively leave the grounds and reveals to Jed the shrine of his murdered children. He has the power to manipulate electronics and objects and leaves skid marks around Leah's house to torment her. At first thinking he was just taking his anger out on Leah, Jed and Ryan discover Leah had killed two children while driving drunk and left them there to die. Mackay has now been after her to make up for the death of his own children and violently torments Leah and attempts to kill her several times. He is eventually put to rest when Jed and Ryan get Leah to call the police and admit her crime.

Elizabeth Smith
A young woman sent to Bedlam for having a child out of wedlock, was killed by the staff in a botched lobotomy. The lobotomy and electro-therapy appear to have made her ghost more erratic than most as she appears unable to take a full corporeal form. She is drawn to Sadie Novak who like her had a child out of wedlock only for it to be still born. She leaves muddy hand-prints around Sadie's apartment and keeps making the box that Sadie buried her child in reappear. Sadie however believes she is hallucinating due to a breakdown and ignores the ghost causing it to become more hostile. The ghost eventually puts a drugged Sadie in a wooden box to be buried by the builders, only for her to be rescued by Jed. Sadie finally realizes the awful truth; that her child had actually started breathing when she was burying it. Satisfied she has given her message Elizabeth's ghost moves on.

Alice Brackley
A daughter of one of the staff who was left unattended in a room with a dangerous patient who smothered her to death. She is rare as a ghost as she still has the ability to speak. She mostly speaks in a child's singsong voice but when she attempts to kill Ella a second time her voice drops to a deeper older voice. Her spirit is connected to her doll and her face is warped to match the doll's damaged appearance, with smeared make up and cracked teeth. She can draw on the walls with chalk and paint and can move at blinding speeds, covering much of the hospital in a matter of minutes. She can also suspend herself on the ceiling like a bat. She is roused when Ella, one of Molly's child minding charges, finds the doll and takes it back to her room, causing Alice to label Ella as a new playmate. Appearing benign at first, her behavior turns dangerous when she tries to kill Ella so that she can have a playmate forever. After saving Ella from a second attempt by Alice, Jed leads her into the cemetery and tells her that she does have friends she can already play with and reveals the ghosts of other children playing in the cemetery. At this Alice runs over to join them, losing her warped appearance and passing on with the other children.

Isabell Hyde
The lover of one of the hospital owner's children who was put inside when she became an inconvenience on his marriage. Her lover continued his affair with her while she was inside, and she eventually slit her wrist when it became obvious the affair wouldn't continue. She has the standard powers of a ghost. She targets Jed's friend Mark because of his familiarity with her lover. She eventually murders him when he keeps trying to leave. Jed and Ryan put her to rest when they bury her with the body of her lover.

Marie
An old woman who died in an apartment block. She is the first ghost seen by Ellie in season 2. When Ellie is trying to revive Marie, she sees her ghost standing over her scowling at her actions before she runs in fright.

Eve
A young child who is secretly communicating with Ellie, trying to lead her to somewhere in Bedlam. Unlike other ghosts, she still appears human and is surrounded by a golden aura. She communicates that her name is Eve in the second episode. There is a connection between her and the Branded Man; she appears to have been murdered by him when they were both still alive.

The Hanged Man
A Bedlam patient who escaped the doctors when they tried to perform a procedure on him. Rather than be recaptured he hanged himself in a crawl space. Ellie accidentally releases his ghost when she comes across his body. He causes improvised nooses to appear through the building and can appear in photos. Because he hanged himself, his spirit's neck is stuck at an odd angle, and his head occasionally twists around at inhuman speeds. He targets Ellie because she disturbed his bones, believing she desecrated his grave. He is put to rest when his bones are returned to the crawl space.

The Branded Man/Joseph Bayle
A mysterious and malevolent ghost who inhabits an older basement level of the hospital. His face is always obscured in shadows, and his head has been shaved and branded with a pentagram-like symbol. First, he appears at the end of the first season when Jed is lured into the basement and again at the start of season two clothed in modern clothing. In season two he stands alone in the basement as the lights flicker eerily and later when Kate tries to leave the building for good. Whilst the audience does not see his face, Kate is terrified by his face and tries to flee, only for him to teleport ahead of her and grab her, leaving her fate unknown until later in the season. He returns at the end of the episode in his lair where he tries to lunge at the audience before the episode ends. In the second episode it is revealed he has ties to the young girl Eve. He also torments Warren in his sleep in a similar manner to the way the ghost in the walled-up room tormented Kate. In episode three, he apparently removes pictures Dan had put up to mess with Warren and further torments him by calling Warren on Kate's phone and breathing menacingly. Eve also reveals that the two of them were connected in life and that he may be her killer. In the fourth episode of the season, his face is seen covered in blood, standing over what appears to be Kate's body, laughing. According to Robert he is the leader of those branded with the Bedlam emblem.

It is later revealed that Joseph Bale is the father of Eve (Ellie) and that Eve had stabbed him by accident while trying to escape. Warren had also hit him on the head and killed him to help Eve escape. He is also a powerful medium able to manipulate ghosts to his bidding as well as the powers possessed by Ellie and Jed.  Warren kills Joseph for the second time, but the only body that is taken out of the building is Warren's. He is also revealed to be the murderer of the missing girls that disappeared through the hospital's history. While Joseph claimed it was to fill the hole left by Eve's departure, Warren claimed Joseph was killing long before Eve was born. It remains unclear what kind of being Joseph is though he claims the barriers between life and death are meaningless to him and Eve killing him actually strengthened his powers.

The Siren
The ghost of a woman who was subjected to a form of water torture by the orderlies in the asylum pool. She eventually committed suicide there by cutting her wrists and her ghost claims the pool as her territory. She rarely leaves the pool and moves through the water like a fish. She attacks professional swimmer-in-training Cass because she too views the pool as a form of torture (albeit subconsciously) and previously tried to cut her wrists before coming to Bedlam. She first tried to kill Cass by drowning her, tricking her into getting her hair caught in a vent on the bottom of the pool. However, Cass gets free but attributes the occurrence as a freak accident, not realizing the real danger she's in. Her second attempt was when Cass was emotionally distraught and attempting to cut her wrists in the pool but changed her mind at the last second. The Siren then took the knife Cass was using and during the resulting struggle she violently slashed Cass's wrists to mirror her own, finishing what Cass had started. When Ellie and Max arrive, they are too late, and Cass had already bled out in the pool. Ellie sees the Siren looking out at her from the cloud of Cass's blood in the pool.

The Siren does not seem to have any special abilities apart from having complete freedom of movement in water, being able to "glide" freely through the Bedlam Pool and temporarily turning Cass's shower water to blood (however Cass does not notice).

Max's Dad
Seen by Max when he was eight years old and the reason for his interest in the supernatural. In episode 6 of season 2, he sat at the foot of Max's bed; though this was a trick by Joseph Bale. Rather than seeing it as a menacing experience, Max said he found it comforting but he revealed that he feels his father was trying to tell him something.

The Bride
Another victim of abuse by the Bettany family; she was abducted from her wedding day and repeatedly and brutally raped by a member of the Bettany family inside the asylum walls. She eventually died of a broken heart and her injuries and roamed the hospital in death. She is attracted at first to the wedding that is planned in the great hall but becomes aggressive when she sees the bride, Rita, to be having an affair with Dan multiple times before the wedding. Since she was robbed of her own wedding in life she feels this is an affront to marriage and begins to torment the bride-to-be; sabotaging her dress, cursing at her in a whispery voice and writing forsaken words all through the flat. Unlike previously seen ghosts, she is not deterred by large crowds and attacks her victim in the middle of the ceremony only to be momentarily distracted when Max reveals the affair. She is put to rest when Max convinces Rita to tell the Bride that the wedding is going to be called off and that she wouldn't get married.

Robert
A child ghost who was murdered by extreme electroshock therapy that scattered his ghost form into the electrical system. The child was sent to Bedlam when his brother blamed him for murdering another boy that he had fought with. The young boy was also autistic, so he had been sent to Bedlam without question. He possesses Jude, another autistic boy, who had recently moved in and begins attacking his older brother, confusing him for his own. He can control electric appliances and make broken appliances work again and he can also absorb lightning. He has knowledge of the abuse in the hospital and the Branded Man.

Priest
A priest working at the asylum hospital who witnessed Joseph Bale's acts of cruelty and treatment of Eve. He baptized Eve in secret and tried to smuggle her out of Bedlam only to be caught by Bale. Bale sewed his lips shut and then murdered him so even in death he would be unable to tell anyone about his deeds. He haunts the chapel and is roused by some teenagers conducting a black mass. At first, he tries to scare them off before they perform the ritual but is unsuccessful and then unleashes his full wrath on them when they perform the ritual. Unlike most ghost he prefers to keep to the shadows and attacks with telekinesis, throwing his victims and objects around. He is also not as murderous as the other Bedlam spirits, only injuring instead of killing his targets. He releases the teenagers when Ellie and Max get their leader to let go of his anger at his father. He is able to pass on when he sees Ellie, recognizing her as Eve who managed to escape and completes his blessing of her before moving on.

References

External links
Official Bedlam website

2010s British drama television series
2011 British television series debuts
2012 British television series endings
British supernatural television shows
English-language television shows
Television series about ghosts
Sky Living original programming
2010s British horror television series